Pianella (locally Pianòlle) is a comune and town in the Province of Pescara in the Abruzzo region of Italy

References

Cities and towns in Abruzzo